Kokila may refer to:

Films 
 Kokila (1937 film), a Hindi-language film
 Kokila (1977 film), a Kannada-language film
 Kokila (1990 film), a Telugu-language film directed by A S Geethakrishna
 Kokilamma, a 1983 Telugu film
 Meendum Kokila, a Tamil language film
 Vasantha Kokila, the Telugu title of 1982 Tamil film Moondram Pirai
 Kokila, a character in the 2010–2017 TV series Saath Nibhaana Saathiya

People 
 Kokila Jayasuriya (born 1994), Sri Lankan actor
Kokila Gunawardena (born 1974), Sri Lankan politician
 Kokila Kishorechandra Bulsara
 Kokila Mohan
 Sadhu Kokila, an Indian actor

Other uses 
 कोकिल Kokila, a Sanskrit name for the koel bird, preserved in the modern terms కోకిల kōkila (Telugu), குயில் kuyil (Tamil), and "koel" (English, French, etc.)
 Kokilapriya, a raga in Carnatic music
 Kokila Sandeśa, a 15th-century Sanskrit love poem written by Uddanda Śāstrī
 Kokila, a variety of the Doromu language of Papua New Guinea
 Kokila, the Assamese name for the freshwater garfish
 Kokila, a publishing imprint of Penguin Young Readers